Glenwood is a  hamlet in southern Erie County, New York, United States.  Straddling the Towns of Sardinia and Colden, it lies on New York State Route 240 and includes such places as Sprague Brook Park and the Kissing Bridge Ski Area.

While it has a post office (zip code 14069), it does not have a flashing light. Other communities include Pratham Road and Craneridge.

Glenwood has two year round restaurants/bars — The Pizza Glen and The Last Run.

References

Hamlets in New York (state)
Hamlets in Erie County, New York